The 5th Mounted Rifles were a light cavalry regiment of the Royal Prussian Army. The regiment was formed 1 October 1908 in Mülhausen in Elsaß.

See also
List of Imperial German cavalry regiments

References

Mounted Rifles of the Prussian Army
Military units and formations established in 1908
1908 establishments in Germany